The Wunü Peaks National Forest Park is a protected forest area under the administration of Tonghua City and to the north of Ji'an in Jilin Province, China. The park extends over an area of 6867 hectares, 95% of which is covered by forest.

See also
Wunü Mountain

Protected areas of China
Parks in Jilin
Tourist attractions in Jilin